The South Australia state football team is the representative side of South Australia in the sport of Australian rules football.

South Australia has a proud history in interstate football, having a successful historical record. South Australia won the second National Football Carnival in 1911 and won two out of the four Interstate Carnivals in the State of Origin era, including the last two.

South Australia has a long and intense rivalry with Victoria. The rivalry was characterised by the catchcry in South Australia called "Kick a Vic", and fans would bring signs of the cry to the games. The South Australia–Victoria rivalry was characterised by long-time South Australian player Andrew Jarman, who has said "it was the mother of all battles". Some of the games between South Australia, Victoria and Western Australia in the 1980s and 1990s have been described as "some of greatest games in the history of Australian football".

The rivalry with Victoria stems from before State of Origin started, when the standard rules prior to 1977 mandated that all VFL players must only play interstate football for Victoria. As most of the country's best players played in the VFL, Victoria dominated the pre–State of Origin era, it created a culture of disdain towards Victoria. Another component of the rivalry is a historical feeling in South Australia that Victoria doesn't rate any player or league outside Victoria. Another contributing factor is a feeling in South Australia that Victorians think they own the game.

History

The first game South Australia played was in the first intercolonial/interstate game in 1878 against Victoria. South Australia has played several games annually from 1879 till when interstate football ended in 1999. South Australia has also participated in every Australian National Football Carnival and always participated in section 1 when there were divisions.

The 1980s was a golden period for South Australia, winning the national championship three times, including an Interstate Carnival Championship.

South Australia won the Interstate Carnival three times and came runner up another eight.

Honour of playing for South Australia

Many players have spoken of the honour of playing for South Australia. Graham Cornes has said when talking about being presented with the South Australian jumper "the pride of holding the jumper first—I can't describe that", and has also said that "pulling the South Australian jumper on is like a dream come true". Former South Australian and Carlton player Andrew McKay has stated, "I never dreamt of playing VFL/AFL as a child, but I always dreamt of playing for my state". Neil Kerley has stated about playing for South Australia that "it was another level". John Platten has been quoted as saying that "state jumpers have to be earned."

Rivalries

Victoria
Although the rivalry with Western Australia is very strong, the rivalry between South Australia and Victoria is the strongest. 

Neil Kerley has stated that beating Victoria was the ultimate in football in South Australia. After stating that the interviewer said "you've got premierships as a player and coach", but Kerley followed up with "they were great" but continued to state it was the ultimate achievement. Neil Kerley has also stated before an Interstate Carnival grand final with Victoria, that "I don't like the Victorians and I think the South Australians are every bit as good". 

Graham Cornes has stated about the rivalry with Victoria that "they don't rate anyone else, they don't regard, it's a lack of respect and appreciation".  He then followed up saying "there've been some great footballers out of South Australia who are just unknown in Victoria". He's also commented on Victoria taking South Australia's best footballers away and making them play for Victoria, stating "you even claimed Malcolm Blight as a Victorian, we never quite forgave you for that". Cornes has also described the football culture in Victoria as insular, for their lack of regard for football outside their state. 

Former Victorian captain Garry Lyon has commented on games in South Australia versus Victoria, that fans in Adelaide absolutely loved those games, the fans in attendance were "hostile and maniacal", and "by the time the games came around they were whipped into a frenzy". 

Ben Hart has talked about South Australia playing Victoria by saying,"the games against Victoria have always been such huge occasions for South Australians". 

Brett Chalmers was quoted saying before South Australia played Victoria in 1992, "I'd love to beat the Victorians, every South Australian doesn't like the Victorians, it'll be great to beat them". 

Victorian Paul Roos has described the first state game he played in South Australia, saying: "when walking up the entrance and onto Football Park [it] was an experience in itself. I quickly realised how much hatred existed towards Victorians and their football". He has also stated about State of Origin games against South Australia, saying: "from an early age I was glued to the television hoping Victoria would destroy South Australia".

Western Australia

South Australia also has an intense rivalry with Western Australia. It has been described that South Australia likes to try and underline its authority over Western Australia and let it be known that it's the more powerful football state of the pair. 

Fans at games between South Australia and Western Australia have been described as vociferous and parochial. A game between Western Australia and South Australia in Adelaide has been described as "parochialism raining".

Notable State of Origin games
South Australia have been involved in some of the most notable games in the history of Australian football. Here are some of them.

1993 South Australia 16.13.109 d Victoria 14.13.97: A close game at the MCG saw South Australia just get home in a game where Darren Jarman kicks six goals and Gary Ablett kicks five.

1992 South Australia 19.19 133 d Victoria 18.12.120: A game that Wayne Carey has described the reason he believed he could succeed in the AFL. In a high scoring game, Stephen Kernahan kicks six goals, Paul Salmon kicks five, Paul Roos kicks three and Wayne Carey dominates at centre half forward, kicking two goals. A classic where South Australia get home in the dying moments.

1984 Victoria 16.12.108 d South Australia 16.8.104: A packed house at Football Park set the stage for a thriller, in a game where Stephen Kernahan kicks ten goals, Paul Salmon kicks five and Peter Daicos kicks three.

1984 Western Australia 14.14.98 d South Australia 14.13.97: One of the most controversial State of Origin games, Western Australia came from 14 points down at the last break to win by a point. Late in the last quarter Western Australia was awarded a controversial free kick close to goal for holding the ball, and took the lead. With scores tied and seconds to go, a Western Australia player kicked a point on the run from outside 50, kicking the ball just before the siren went, to give Western Australia the lead.

1994 South Australia 11.9.75 d Victoria 10.13.73: A game regarded as one of the greatest games in the history of Australian football. In a close game, Tony Modra kicks six goals and Gary Ablett kicks four.

1986 South Australia 18.17.125 d Victoria 17.13.115: A high scoring game, where Stephen Kernahan, Grenville Dietrich, and Victoria Australian rules football team's Paul Salmon all kick 4 goals. The game also features John Platten, Tony McGuiness, Greg Williams, Dale Weightman, Chris McDermott and Dermott Brereton.

1987 South Australia 12.13.85 d Victoria 11.15.81: South Australia get home in a close finish, in a game that features John Platten, Chris McDermott, Gary Ablett, Dermott Brereton and Tony McGuiness.

1983 South Australia 26.16.172 d Victoria 17.14.117: In front of 42,521 parochial home fans at Football Park, the Croweaters earned their first win over Victoria at home since 1964 with a stirring 53-point win. Starring for South Australia were Fos Williams Medalist Michael Aish, Bruce Lindner, Peter Motley, John Platten and Mark Naley

Croweaters in popular culture
There was a song created about South Australia, called "Came from Adelaide", which describes two people watching a game between South Australia and Victoria, when one person says "Those Croweaters just can't play", while the other person replies: "That just isn't true, South Australians are great, as I'm about to tell you."

Carnival history

1908: 3rd
1911: 1st
1914: 2nd
1921: 3rd
1924: 3rd
1927: 3rd
1930: 2nd
1933: 2nd
1937: 3rd
1947: 3rd
1950: 2nd
1953: 2nd
1956: 4th
1958: 4th
1961: 3rd
1966: 3rd
1969: 2nd
1972: 3rd
1975: 2nd
1979: 3rd
1980: 2nd
1988: 1st, Division 1
1993: 1st, Division 1

National Under 18 Championships
7: 1978, 1979, 1980, 1991, 1995, 2013, 2014, 2018

Fos Williams Medal
The Fos Williams Medal was awarded to the best player from a South Australian team. The medal was first awarded in 1981.

List of matches

Other state teams
The South Australian National Football League has a representative state team that plays annually against other state league teams. The South Australian Amateur Football League has a state team that plays annually against other state amateur league teams. There was a women's Victorian representative team that played annually in the defunct AFL Women's National Championships. There are also Under-18 South Australian teams that competes annually in the AFL and AFL Women's Under-18 Championships. 

South Australia is also represented in the annual veterans' game, the E. J. Whitten Legends Game, by the All-Stars team representing all states apart from Victoria.

References

South Australian National Football League
Australian rules football in South Australia
Australian rules football representative teams
Australian rules interstate football